Van Praet is a surname. Notable people with the surname include:

Joseph Van Praet (1754–1837), French librarian
Jules Van Praet (1806–1887), Belgian diplomat
Louis of Praet (1488–1555), Dutch diplomat and politician
Michael Van Praet (born 1989), Canadian football player

See also 
Adolfo Van Praet, village in La Pampa Province, Argentina
Praet, list of people with the surname Praet
van Praet d'Amerloo, Belgian noble family dating back to the XII century

Surnames of Dutch origin